Hong Gil Nam is a South Korean biologist teaching in the Department of New Biology of Daegu Gyeongbuk Institute of Science and Technology and leading research as director of the Center for Plant Aging Research. His research interests include comparative aging in diverse kingdoms, including plant and animals, to reveal aging mechanisms among species, cross-kingdom interaction between plants and animals, and biochemistry at nano and micro levels. He is the founder and former director of the Biological Research Information Center, a member of the Korean Academy of Science and Technology, and has served on the editorial board in Molecular Plant  since 2013.

Education
Nam did his undergraduate studies in chemistry at Seoul National University and received his Ph.D. degree in the same field from the University of North Carolina, Chapel Hill, United States, in 1985.

Career
From 1986 to 1988, he worked as a research fellow in the Department of Genetics of Harvard Medical School. He then returned to Korea to start work as an assistant professor in the Department of Chemistry, POSTECH. He later became an assistant professor, full professor, and chair of POSTECH's Department of Life Sciences before being the head of the School of Interdisciplinary Biosciences and Bioengineering (I-BIO)  and Hong Deok Distinguished Professor. Outside of his work at POSTECH, he founded and directed the Biological Research Information Center (BRIC) from 1996 to 2005.

He left his positions in POSTECH in 2012 to be a full professor in the Department of New Biology, Daegu Gyeongbuk Institute of Science and Technology (DGIST) and founding director of the Center for Plant Aging Research, Institute for Basic Science (IBS).

Awards
2014: Ho-Am Prize in Science, Ho-Am Foundation, South Korea
2010: National Scientist, Ministry of Education, Science and Technology and National Research Foundation of Korea
2009: National Academy of Sciences Award, South Korea
2009: 54th National Academy of Science Award in the field of Basic Science, National Academy of Sciences, South Korea
2009: POSCO TJ Park Prize in the field of Science, POSCO TJ Park Foundation, South Korea
2005: Korea Science Award, South Korea

References

External links
Center for Plant Aging Research
Naver 인문검색 - 남홍길

Seoul National University alumni
South Korean biologists
Recipients of the Ho-Am Prize in Science
Living people
1957 births
University of North Carolina alumni
Botanists active in Asia
Academic staff of Pohang University of Science and Technology
Institute for Basic Science